Tim Ward (born August 11, 1997) is an American football outside linebacker for the Houston Roughnecks of the XFL. He played college football for Old Dominion.

College career
Ward was a member of the Old Dominion Monarchs for four seasons. He finished his collegiate career with 125 tackles, 30.5 tackles for loss, 14 sacks and eight passes broken up in 47 games played.

Professional career

Kansas City Chiefs
Ward was signed by the Kansas City Chiefs as an undrafted free agent on May 3, 2019. He spent his rookie season on the non-football injury list. Ward was cut at the end of training camp in 2020, but was re-signed to the Chiefs' practice squad shortly afterwards. He was signed to Kansas City's active roster on November 12, 2020. Ward made his NFL debut in Week 17 of the 2020 season against the Los Angeles Chargers, starting the game and finishing with five tackles, including his first career sack, in a 21–38 loss. He was waived on August 31, 2021.

New York Jets
Ward was claimed off waivers by the New York Jets on September 1, 2021. The Jets released him on August 16, 2022.

Green Bay Packers
On November 15, 2022, Ward was signed to the Green Bay Packers practice squad.

References

External links
Green Bay Packers bio
Old Dominion Monarchs bio
Kansas City Chiefs bio

1997 births
Living people
African-American players of American football
Players of American football from North Carolina
American football defensive ends
Old Dominion Monarchs football players
Kansas City Chiefs players
New York Jets players
Green Bay Packers players
21st-century African-American sportspeople